The montane woodcreeper (Lepidocolaptes lacrymiger) is a perching bird species in the subfamily Dendrocolaptinae of the ovenbird family (Furnariidae).

It is found in Bolivia, Colombia, Ecuador, Peru, and Venezuela. Its natural habitat is subtropical or tropical moist montane forests.

References

montane woodcreeper
Birds of the Northern Andes
Birds of the Venezuelan Coastal Range
montane woodcreeper
Taxonomy articles created by Polbot